Éric Cubilier (born 9 May 1979) is a French former professional footballer who played as a defender. He was a member of the County of Nice national football team at the 2014 ConIFA World Football Cup.

References

External links

Living people
1979 births
French footballers
Association football defenders
OGC Nice players
AS Monaco FC players
Paris Saint-Germain F.C. players
RC Lens players
FC Nantes players
FC Metz players
SC Bastia players
Ligue 1 players
Ligue 2 players